Roland Bernard Raforme (born 5 April 1966) is a Seychellois former boxer and double Olympian.

Representing Seychelles in the men's light heavyweight category at the 1992 Summer Olympics, Raforme reached the quarter-finals where he was beaten by the Hungarian boxer Zoltán Béres on points. Returning four years later to compete in the same event at the Atlanta Games, he was stopped in the first round by Troy Amos-Ross. Raforme was more successful in the 1998 Commonwealth Games where he won a silver medal in the men's heavyweight category after losing in the final to Mark Simmons from Canada. Previously, he represented Seychelles at the 1994 Commonwealth Games.

References

Seychellois male boxers
1966 births
Living people
Olympic boxers of Seychelles
Boxers at the 1992 Summer Olympics
Boxers at the 1996 Summer Olympics
Boxers at the 1994 Commonwealth Games
Boxers at the 1998 Commonwealth Games
Commonwealth Games silver medallists for Seychelles
Commonwealth Games medallists in boxing
African Games bronze medalists for Seychelles
African Games medalists in boxing
Competitors at the 1991 All-Africa Games
Competitors at the 1995 All-Africa Games
Heavyweight boxers
Medallists at the 1998 Commonwealth Games